David ben Solomon Altaras was an Italian rabbi and editor who flourished at Venice, 1675–1714. He wrote the short Hebrew grammar in the quarto Bible (Venice, 1675–78). He edited a daily prayer-book (Venice, 1696) and a vocalized edition of the Mishnah with short notes (Venice, 1756–60). His will is printed under the title Sefer Tsuf Devash (Venice, 1714).

See also 
Altaras family

References 

Sephardi rabbis
17th-century births
18th-century deaths
17th-century Republic of Venice rabbis
18th-century Republic of Venice rabbis
Place of birth unknown
Italian Sephardi Jews